Kenneth Grant Tremayne Webster (1871–1942) was a Canadian-born American literary scholar. He was born in Yarmouth, Nova Scotia, and was educated at Dalhousie University, graduating in 1892. He then took another undergraduate degree at Harvard University, followed by a master's and doctorate there, after which he was immediately offered a faculty position at the institution. Influenced by Archibald MacMechan he became a medievalist and Arthurian scholar, with an interest in castles.

Webster was also a restorer of historic houses. They include the Barnard Capen House from the early seventeenth century in Dorchester, Massachusetts, which he moved to its current site in Milton, Massachusetts in 1913, and the eighteenth century Ross-Thompson House in Shelburne, Nova Scotia, which he bought in 1932 to save it from demolition, and is now a museum.

Works
Chief British poets of the fourteenth and fifteenth centuries (1916) editor with William Allan Neilson
Sir Gawain & The Green Knight: Piers the Ploughman (1917) translator with William Alan Nielson
Lanzelet: A Romance of Lancelot by Ulrich Von Zatzikhoven (1951)
 New print with additional notes by Roger Sherman Loomis. Columbia University Press, New York City 2005, .
Guinevere: A Study of Her Abductions (1951)

Notes

External links
Castle colleection at Dalhousie University

Arthurian scholars
1871 births
1942 deaths
Harvard University alumni
Canadian emigrants to the United States
Canadian literary critics
Canadian people of British descent
People from Yarmouth, Nova Scotia